Chernelházadamonya is a village in Vas County, Hungary.

External links 
 Street map 

Populated places in Vas County